Kota, previously known as Kotah, is a city located in the southeast of northern Indian state of Rajasthan. With a population of over 1.2 million, it is the third most populous city of Rajasthan after Jaipur and Jodhpur, 46th most populous city of India and 53rd most populous urban agglomeration of India. It serves as the administrative headquarters for Kota district and Kota division. Kota is a major coaching hub of the country for competitive examination preparations and has a number of engineering and medical coaching institutes.

The city of Kota was once the part of the erstwhile Rajput kingdom of Bundi. It became a separate princely state in the 16th century. Apart from the several monuments that reflect the glory of the town, Kota is also known for its palaces and gardens. 
Mahesh Vijay of Bhartiya Janta Party was the last mayor of Kota. As of now, the city is being divided into two different legislative bodies known as Kota North and Kota South. The current mayor of Kota North is Manju Mehra from Indian National Congress and current mayor of Kota South is Rajeev Agarwal from Indian National Congress. The city was also included among 98 Indian cities for Smart Cities Mission initiated by Indian Prime Minister Narendra Modi in 2015 and was listed at 67th place after results of first round were released following which top 20 cities were further selected for funding in the immediate financial year. It is popular among the youth of India for its coaching institutes for engineering and medical entrance examinations. Many students come to Kota to prepare for the JEE, NEET and many other competitive exams.

History

The history of the city dates back to the 12th century CE when Rao Deva, a Chauhan Rajput chieftain belonging to the Hada clan conquered the territory and founded Bundi and Hadoti. Later, in the early 17th century, during the reign of the Mughal Emperor Jahangir, the ruler of Bundi – Rao Ratan Singh, gave the smaller principality of Kota to his son, Madho Singh. Since then Kota became a hallmark of the Rajput gallantry and culture.

Kota became an independent state in 1631 when Rao Madho Singh, the second son of Rao Ratan of [Bundi] was made the ruler, by the Mughal Emperor Jahangir. Soon Kota outgrew its parent state to become bigger in area, richer in revenue and more powerful. Maharao Bhim Singh played a pivotal role in Kota's history, having held a 'Mansab' of five thousand and being the first in his dynasty to have the title of Maharao. Zalim Singh, a diplomat, and statesman, emerged as another prominent figure of the state in the 18th century. Although initially being a general of Kota's army, he rose to the regent of the kingdom after the king died leaving a minor on the throne. He remained a direct administrator of the state. In 1817, a treaty of friendship was signed between him and the British on his condition of carving out part from the existing state for his descendants resulting in Jhalawar coming into existence in 1838. Kota was not involved in the earlier events of the Indian Rebellion of 1857. However, when in October 1857 rebels murdered the local British resident and his two sons, British forces responded by storming the city and, after some resistance, capturing it in March 1858.

In the 1940s, social activist Guru Radha Kishan organised trade union activities and campaigned against the colonial government. He left Kota after the local administration learned of the arrest warrant issued against him for his participation in Indian Independence activities.

Princely city of Kota

Kota became independent in 1579, after Bundi state in Hadoti region had become weak. Then, Kota ruled the territory which now is Kota district and Baran district.

Geography

Kota is located along the banks of the Chambal River in the southern part of Rajasthan. It is the 3rd largest city of Rajasthan after Jaipur and Jodhpur. It has an average elevation of 271 metres (889 ft). The district is bound on the north and north west by Sawai Madhopur, Tonk and Bundi districts. The Chambal River separates these districts from Kota district, forming the natural boundary.

The city of Kota is situated at the centre of the southeastern region of Rajasthan a region very widely known as Hadoti, the land of the Hadas. Kota lies along the banks of the Chambal river on a high sloping tableland forming a part of the Malwa Plateau. The general slope of the city is towards the north. The comparatively rocky, barren, and elevated land in the southern part of the city descends towards a plain agricultural land in the north. The Mukundara hills run from southeast to northwest axis of the town.

Kota has fertile land and greenery with irrigation facilities through canals. The two main canals; called as left main canal (towards Bundi) and right main canal (towards Baran) originate from the reservoir created by Kota Barrage. The tributaries of these canals make up a network in the city and surrounding areas of Rajasthan and Madhya Pradesh and supplements the irrigation of these areas.

Climate

Kota has a semi-arid climate (Köppen climate classification BSh) with high temperatures throughout the year. Summers are long, hot, and dry, starting in late March and lasting till the end of June. The temperatures average above 40 °C in May and June, frequently exceed 45 °C with temperatures as high as 48.5 °C also been recorded. The monsoon season follows with comparatively lower temperatures, but higher humidity and frequent, torrential downpours. The monsoons subside in October and temperatures rise again. The brief, mild winter starts in late November and lasts until the last week of February. Temperatures hover between 26.7 °C (max) to 12.0 °C (min). This can be considered the best time to visit Kota because of intense heat in the summer.

The average annual rainfall in the Kota district is 660.6 mm. Most of the rainfall can be attributed to the southwest monsoon which has its beginning around the last week of June and may last till mid-September. Pre-monsoon showers begin towards the middle of June with post-monsoon rains occasionally occurring in October. The winter is largely dry, although some rainfall does occur as a result of the Western Disturbance passing over the region.

Demographics

According to 2011 Census of India, Kota City had a population of 1,001,694 of which male and female are 528,601 and 473,093 respectively. The provisional results of census 2011 reported city's population as 1,001,365. The urban agglomeration of Kota consists of city only. The sex ratio was 895 and 12.14% were under six years of age. The effective literacy rate was 82.80%, with male literacy at 89.49% and female literacy at 75.33%.

Harauti, a dialect of Rajasthani is widely spoken in Kota with Hindi, Marwari and English being the other languages spoken.

According to 2011 census, Hinduism is the majority religion in the city practised by about 80.5% of the population. Muslims form large minorities (15.9%) followed by Jains (2.2%), Sikhs (0.9%) and Christians (0.4%).

Government institutions and courts

Governmental institutions in Kota include:
Municipal Corporation
Collectorate
Office of the Divisional Commissioner
Rajasthan Housing Board
Command Area Development (CAD)
Urban Improvement Trust (UIT)
Office of the Superintendent of Police, Inspector General of Police, and the Income Tax commissioner of Kota range.
Office of the Divisional Railway Manager, Kota Division, West Central Railway
Office of Deputy Commissioner of central excise and service tax
Instrumentation Ltd is a Public Sector company based in Kota. Its clientele includes public sector entities such as the Indian Railways, BSNL and VSNL. Presently, it has been shut down.

The District court provides court and notary services.

Economy
The city is the trade centre for an area in which cotton, millet, wheat, coriander and oilseeds are grown; industries include cotton and oilseed milling, textile weaving, distilling, dairying, and the manufacture of metal handcrafts. Kota also has an extensive industry of stone-polishing (tiles) of a stone called Kota Stone, used for the floor and walls of residential and business buildings. Since last 15 years Kota has emerged as an Education hub of the country as producing excellent results in IIT-JEE and medical entrance exams.

Kota educational industry 
A major part of Kota's economy depends on its student population. Every year more than 150,000 students visit and study in Kota to study and prepare for JEE and NEET.

The entrance coaching industry in Kota generates business of about 40,000 million from them which further contributes towards the economy of the region. Over time, the economical growth and money generated through education in Kota seems to have overtaken other popular economical activities of the region by contributing more and more with time.

Kota Doria or Kota Doriya and Sarees

Weaving in Kota was started by Maharana Bhimdev in the 18th century.

The Kota saris like most traditional piece of work had started becoming lost before designer Vidhi Singhania moved to Kota and started working with the workers to revive its market. Many textile shops in the city sell different varieties of Kota doriya. These saris have become one of the trademarks of the city.

Kota stone

The fine-grained variety of limestone quarried from Kota district is known as Kota stone, with rich greenish-blue and brown colours. Kota stone is tough, non-water-absorbent, non-slip, and non-porous. The varieties include Kota Blue Natural, Kota Blue Honed, Kota Blue Polished, Kota Blue Cobbles, Kota Brown Natural and Kota Brown Polished.

Industries
Kota is one of the industrial hubs in northern India, with chemical, cement, engineering and power plants based there. The total number of industrial units in the district in 2010–11 stood at 12908 with 705 registered units. The district power plants show annual growth of 15–20% due to their strategic locations.

Power plants
Kota is surrounded by five power stations within its 50 km radius.

 Kota Super Thermal Power Plant – thermal
 Rajasthan Atomic Power Station in Rawatbhata Chittorgarh district (65 kilometres from Kota) – nuclear
 NTPC Anta Gas Power Plant in Antah Baran district (50 kilometers from Kota) – gas
 Jawahar Sagar Power Plant – hydro
 Kalisindh Thermal Power Station (in Jhalrapatan, Jhalawar) – thermal
Surya Chambal Power Plant in Rangpur Kota district - biomass

Education
The city is especially known in India as a center for the preparation of various national level competitive examinations through which the students seek admissions in various engineering and medical colleges of the country. Often termed as the "Kota Factory", the town contains more than 40 large coaching institutes for aspiring students trying to pass entrance exams for Indian Institutes of Technology (IIT), through the IIT JEE, other engineering colleges and prominent medical colleges of India.

Since 2000, the city has emerged as a popular coaching destination for competitive exams preparation and for profit educational services. The education sector of Kota has become one of the major contributors to the city's economy. Kota is popularly referred to as "the coaching capital of India". Over 150,000 students from all over the country flock every year towards the city for preparation of various exams such as IIT-JEE and NEET-UG etc. Many  hostels and PGs are located in Kota near the vicinity of coaching centres for students. Students live here for 2–3 years and prepare for the exams. The annual turnover of the Kota coaching industry is about ₹1500 crore. The majority of the students here are enrolled in schools, providing the facility of "dummy schooling", which gives students admissions without the need to attend it regularly. However, it is an illegal practice. In 2019, The Viral Fever launched a Web Series called Kota Factory to shed light on the life of students who study at Kota.

Kota's emergence as a coaching hub began in 1985 when Vinod Kumar Bansal, an engineer set up Bansal Classes that eventually became Bansal Classes Private Limited.

Student Suicides
In the past few years, reports of students dying by suicide in the city have increased. As per reports, students feel stressed and get pressurized in order to crack their target competitive exam. As per National Crime Records Bureau report of 2014, 45 suicide cases of students were reported in the city. In year 2015, 17 such cases were found. For the same cause, many coaching centers have also appointed counsellors and are organising recreational activities to help students.

Colleges
Government Medical College, Kota
University Engineering College, Kota

Universities

Agriculture University, Kota
Indian Institute of Information Technology, Kota
Rajasthan Technical University
University of Kota
Vardhaman Mahaveer Open University

Places of interest

Some of the popular visitor attractions in and nearby the city include Chambal Garden, Chambal River Front, Seven Wonders Park, Kishore Sagar Lake, Jag Mandir, Kota Garh Palace, Chatra Vilas Garden, Ganesh Udyan, Traffic Garden, Godavari Dham Temple, Geparnath Temple, Garadia Mahadev Temple, Chattaneshwar Mandir, Kota Zoological Park, Abheda Biological Park, City Park(IL Oxizone), Chatrapati Shivaji Park, Maharao Madho Singh Museum, Kota Government Museum, Brijraj Bhawan Palace, Abheda Mahal, Royal Cenotaphs at Kshar Bagh, Kota Barrage, Khade Ganesh Ji Mandir, Shiv Puri Dham, Maa Trikuta Mandir, Kansua Shiv Mandir, Darrah National Park and Jawahar Sagar Dam.

Transport
Kota is well connected with road and rail to all major cities within Rajasthan as well as those located outside the state.

Roadways
Kota have two major interstate bus terminals, namely, Nayapura Bus Stand at Nayapura and Roadways New Bus Stand at Ramchandrapura.
National Highway No.27 (via Udaipur, Kanpur, Gorakhpur, Guwahati) and National highway No.52 (via Hisar, Churu, Sikar, Jaipur, Indore, Aurangabad, Solapur and Hubli) pass through the Kota City. National Highway No.27 is a part of East-West Corridor(Porbandar - Silchar) and National Highway No.52 connects Punjab to Karnataka (Sangrur, Punjab—Ankola, Karnataka). The total road length in Kota district is 2,052 km as of March 2011. There are also three upcoming expressway projects in the form of Delhi–Mumbai Expressway (Via Kota, Rajasthan and Vadodara), Kota–Hyderabad Expressway (Via Indore) and Chambal Expressway.

Railways

Kota is well connected to all the major cities of India with rail.
Kota Junction is one of the divisions in West Central Railway. It is a station on the New Delhi–Mumbai main line. There are four railway stations within Kota and in its vicinity. One Substation of East Kota City is Sogariya(Kota Bypass) Railway Station and Another suburban station of South Kota city is Dakaniya Talav railway station which has a stoppage of Avadh Express, Dehradun Express and Ranthambore Express.

The city is a halt for over 182 trains, including Mumbai Rajdhani Express, August Kranti Rajdhani Express, Thiruvananthapuram Rajdhani Express, Madgaon Rajdhani Express, Mumbai New Delhi Duronto Express, Golden Temple Mail, Paschim Express, Bandra Terminus-Hazrat Nizamuddin Garib Rath Express, Kevadiya–Hazrat Nizamuddin Gujarat Sampark Kranti Express, Gujarat Sampark Kranti Express, Maharashtra Sampark Kranti Express, Goa Sampark Kranti Express, Kerala Sampark Kranti Express, Indore–Jaipur Express, Gangaur SuperFast Express, Mewar Express, Dayodaya Express, Jodhpur – Indore Intercity, Hazrat Nizamuddin - Indore Express, Garbha Express, Marusagar Express (Ajmer – Ernakulam Express / Ernakulam Express), Jaipur–Mysore Superfast Express, Swaraj Express, Chennai Central–Jaipur Superfast Express, Coimbatore–Jaipur Superfast Express, Jodhpur – Puri Express, Bandra Terminus–Gorakhpur Avadh Express, Bandra Terminus–Muzaffarpur Avadh Express, Jodhpur – Bhopal Express.

The Delhi—Mumbai railway line passes through the Kota Junction.
The district has 148.83 km of railway line in the Kota – Ruthia section, 98.72 km on Nagda—Mathura (Mumbai-Delhi) section and 24.26 km on Kota —Chittorgarh section.

A broad-gauge railway facility between Kota and Jodhpur via Jaipur exists.

Airways
Kota Airport, (IATA: KTU, ICAO: VIKO) is a civil airport serving Kota, Rajasthan, India. Spread over 447 acres, Kota Airport was originally built by the Royal family of the princely state of Kota and was taken over by the government in 1951. This Airport Also Known As Rajputana Airport. Originally serviced by Indian Airlines Dakota aircraft and later by Vayudoot and Jagson Airlines, shutdown of major industries and Kota becoming a major railway junction effected decreased demand for air transport and the withdrawal of the airlines.
Kota Airport has had no scheduled services operating since 1999. The nearest international airport is Jaipur International Airport situated around 240 km away from Kota.
Development of Greenfield airport at Kota: The representative of Rajasthan Government intimated that runway length of Existing Kota Airport is only 4000 ft., which restricts flight operations under RCS. A new Greenfield Airport is to be constructed in Kota. State Government has earmarked required land for this purpose. State Government has provided Meteorological Information of past 10 years and AAI has carried out pre- feasibility survey & provided its report to the State Government. Further, AAI has been requested twice to carry out Site and OLS Survey and to provide further course of action to be taken by the State Government, which is approved. Directions need to be issued to AAI for early completion of the same. For development of Greenfield airport at Kota, 1250 Acres of land acquired by the State Government and handed over to AAI for development of New Greenfield Airport.

Sports

The city is home to Jay Kaylon Cricket Stadium located in Nayapura area. Among several matches, six Ranji Trophy matches have been played in the stadium. The stadium also hosted RCL T20 2016, an inter state cricket league with six participating teams. Kota has majority of sports teams like Cricket, Football, Hockey, Basketball, Badminton, Shooting, Table Tennis, and Lawn Tennis.

Media

Television 
There are five major regional TV Channels in Kota.
 DD Rajasthan
 Media House Rajasthan(MHR News)
 ETV Rajasthan
 India news Rajasthan
 Jan TV

A wide range of other Hindi, English, and other language channels are accessible via cable subscription and direct-broadcast satellite services. Dish TV, Tata Sky, Radiant Digitek, Airtel digital TV are entertainment services in Kota.

Newspapers 
Major daily newspapers in Kota include:
 Rajasthan Patrika (Hindi)
 Dainik Bhaskar (Hindi)
 Dainik Navajyoti (Hindi)
Chambal Sandesh (Hindi)

Radio 
There are five radio stations in Kota, with four broadcasting on the FM band, and one All India Radio station broadcasting on the AM band.
 All India Radio (102.0 MHz)
 Big FM (92.7 MHz)
 My FM (94.3 MHz)
 FM Tadka (95.0 MHz)
 Radio City (91.1 MHz)

Notable people

Umed Singh II
Om Birla
Ijyaraj Singh
Onkarlal Berwa
Shanti Kumar Dhariwal
Vinod Kumar Bansal
Bhim Singh II
Lalit Kishore Chaturvedi
Bhuvnesh Chaturvedi 
Krishana Kumar Goyal
Shail Hada
Taj Haider
Hari Kumar Audichya
Raghuveer Singh Koshal
Shiv Kumari of Kotah
Bhuvaneshwari Kumari
Nikita Lalwani
Pramod Maheshwari
Aniruddh Singh
 Dau Dayal Joshi

References

Further reading
 Tod James Annals and Antiquities of Rajasthan: Or, The Central and Western Rajpoot States of India Published 2001 Asian Educational Services  pp. 407–690

External links

Official website of Kota District

 
Metropolitan cities in India